Matton may refer to:

People 
Alain Georges Matton (born 8 October 1965), Flemish (Belgian) liberal politician and is in the European diplomatic service
Thomas Matton (born 24 October 1985, Belgian footballer
Léonard Matton (born in 1979), French actor and director
Charles Matton (1931-2008), French artist (on French Wikipedia :fr:Charles Matton)
Roger Matton (1929-2004), Canadian composer, ethnomusicologist, and music educator
Jean Matton, French World War I cavalryman and flying ace
Arsène Matton (1873–1953), Belgian sculptor (on French Wikipedia :fr:Arsène Matton)
Ida Matton (1863–1940), Swedish sculptor

Places
Matton-et-Clémency, a commune in the Ardennes department in northern France
Matton (commune), former commune in northern France now part of the merged commune Matton-et-Clémency
 Arboretum de Matton-Clémency, an arboretum located in Matton-et-Clémency, Ardennes
Matton (river), small French river in the department of Ardennes

Other uses 
Matton (mythology) is a figure in Greek mythology.
Matton Shipyard, a historic shipyard and canal boat service yard located on Van Schaick Island at Cohoes in Albany County, New York

See also 
 Mattan (disambiguation)
 Matten, a village in Switzerland
 Maton